Nye is a village situated in Vetlanda Municipality, Jönköping County, Sweden with 203 inhabitants in 2005.

References

External links 

Populated places in Jönköping County